Sir Arthur Kirwan Agar (31 August 1877 – July 1942) was a British barrister and colonial judge. He was Chief Justice of British Honduras from 1936 to 1940.

Biography 
Agar was the son of solicitor Edward Larpent Agar, of Milford House, Milford-on-Sea and the grandson of William Agar, after whose father Agar Town was named. His siblings included the landscape designer Madeline Agar and the Anglo-Australian zoologist Wilfred Eade Agar.

Agar was educated at Brighton College. During the First World War, he served in the Royal Army Service Corps, reaching the rank of captain. After being called to the English Bar by Gray's Inn, Agar entered the Colonial Legal Service in 1920. He was appointed Chief Justice of British Honduras in 1936, serving until 1940. Knighted in 1939, Agar died in Springfield, Dominica in 1942.

Agar married in 1905 Winifred Milbourne Raynes, daughter of John George Raynes; they had two daughters. He married secondly in 1930 Josephine Hutchings, daughter of Hugh Houston Hutchings.

References 

 "Sir Arthur Kirwan Agar", The Times, 20 July 1942, p. 8.

1877 births
1942 deaths
People educated at Brighton College
Royal Army Service Corps officers
British Army personnel of World War I
Members of Gray's Inn
Colonial Legal Service officers
Chief Justices of British Honduras
Knights Bachelor